The Birdwatcher aka The Observer (Estonian title: Vaatleja) is an Estonian film directed by Arvo Iho for the Tallinnfilm studio, filmed in 1987 in the northern Urals, and first shown in cinemas in 1988. It stars Svetlana Tormahova as a Russian forester and Erik Ruus as a student who meets her while studying ornithology on the island where she works.

Iho had previously worked with Leida Leius on several documentaries, and The Birdwatcher is his solo directorial debut.

The Birdwatcher won awards at the Karlovy Vary International Film Festival, the Torino Film Festival, and the Rouen Nordic Film Festival.

Plot
24-year old Estonian ornithology student Peeter travels to a small island in the Russian North for fieldwork, where he meets Aleksandra, a middle-aged Russian forester and poacher. They begin a love/hate relationship that leads to tragic consequences when Peeter is killed in a trap set by Aleksandra.

Cast
Svetlana Tormahova – Aleksandra
Erik Ruus – Peeter

Reception
In the book Postcolonial Approaches to Eastern European Cinema: Portraying Neighbours on Screen, the authors commented on the polarities between the two characters, with Peeter representing mind, law and order, rationality, and idealism, while Aleksandra represents body, criminality, barbarity, and cynicism, which they equated to Edward Said's characterization of the occidental and oriental, with "Russia [functioning] to a considerable degree as a negative model against which Estonian 'Westernness' is constructed", and their affair "symbolic of the complicated relationship between Russia and the Baltic countries it subjugated to its power".

Awards
Karlovy Vary International Film Festival (Czech Republic), 1988, FIPRESCI prize for best debut film
Torino Film Festival (Italy), 1989, Jury Special Award
Rouen Nordic Film Festival (France), 1990, Grand Prix

References

External links
 

1987 films
Soviet drama films
Estonian-language films
Soviet-era Estonian films
Tallinnfilm films
Films directed by Arvo Iho
Estonian drama films